Sidney Coleman is a former professional American football player who played linebacker for five seasons for the Tampa Bay Buccaneers and Arizona Cardinals.

References

1964 births
American football linebackers
Tampa Bay Buccaneers players
Arizona Cardinals players
Southern Miss Golden Eagles football players
Living people
Sportspeople from Gulfport, Mississippi
Players of American football from Mississippi